Saint-Jean-de-Bournay is a commune in the Isère department in southeastern France.

Population

International relations
It is twinned with Wath-upon-Dearne, South Yorkshire, England.

See also 
 Communes of the Isère department

References 

Communes of Isère
Isère communes articles needing translation from French Wikipedia